Daphne Alexander is a Cypriot/British actress best known for playing Nadia Talianos in the BBC Drama series Casualty and Modesty Blaise in three BBC radio adaptations.

Early life
Alexander was born and brought up in Cyprus, living later in both Paris, France and London, England. She studied law at Somerville College, Oxford before training to be an actress at LAMDA.

Career
Soon after graduating from LAMDA, Alexander was cast in the BBC's long running medical drama Casualty, playing nurse Nadia from February to December 2007. She went on to roles in the HBO/BBC co-production House of Saddam, and the movies The Fourth Kind and The Ghost Writer, working with Roman Polanski on the latter. In 2011 she starred in the short film The Palace, which won multiple awards and received wide critical acclaim.

On stage, Alexander has worked in both London and New York. Notable productions include Hidden in the Sand (2013) and City Stories (2013, ongoing), both by James Phillips, and Camelot: The Shining City (2015) by Alan Lane of the Slung Low Theatre Company.

She has also done voice work, most notably playing Modesty Blaise in a series of adaptations for BBC Radio 4 and various characters in video game Assassin's Creed Odyssey.

Filmography

Film and television

Theatre

Radio

Video games

References

External links

Living people
Cypriot film actresses
Cypriot stage actresses
Cypriot television actresses
Cypriot voice actresses
British film actresses
British stage actresses
British television actresses
British voice actresses
Actresses from London
21st-century Cypriot actresses
21st-century British actresses
Alumni of the London Academy of Music and Dramatic Art
Year of birth missing (living people)
Alumni of Somerville College, Oxford
21st-century English women
21st-century English people